The zubivka also known as a (Skosivka, Skisna Dudka, or Frukanka).

The zubivka is considered one of the oldest folk wind instruments in Ukraine and is found primarily in the Carpathian region. 

It was first described by wandering Arabic scholars in the 11th century. This instrument is very similar to the telenka, only instead of having a fipple, it is played like the sopilka or frilka, by having the breath break against the side of the pipe. This surface is wedge-shaped. The zubivka is usually approximately 60 cm (24 in) long.

Related instruments
As with many Ukrainian folk instruments played in the Carpathians, the zubivka is also known and played by musicians in other ethnic groups in contact with the Ukrainians.

See also
Ukrainian folk music

Sources

Humeniuk, A. - Ukrainski narodni muzychni instrumenty - Kyiv: Naukova dumka, 1967
Mizynec, V. - Ukrainian Folk Instruments - Melbourne: Bayda books, 1984
Cherkaskyi, L. - Ukrainski narodni muzychni instrumenty // Tekhnika, Kyiv, Ukraine, 2003 - 262 pages. 

Side-blown flutes
Ukrainian musical instruments